Allium virgunculae is a species of onion native to warm areas of Kyushu, Japan. Available from commercial suppliers, it is a late blooming ornamental onion, reaching about 25cm, and considered to be a good plant to attract pollinators.

Varieties
The following varieties are currently accepted:

Allium virgunculae var. koshikiense M.Hotta & Hir.Takah.bis
Allium virgunculae var. virgunculae
Allium virgunculae var. yakushimense M.Hotta

References

virgunculae
Plants described in 1952